The Herschell–Spillman Noah's Ark Carousel, located in southeast Portland, Oregon, is listed on the National Register of Historic Places.

Constructed around 1913, it is located within the Oaks Amusement Park, a -year-old "trolley park".

See also
 National Register of Historic Places listings in Southeast Portland, Oregon

References

Further reading

External links

1903 establishments in Oregon
Amusement rides introduced in 1903
Carousels on the National Register of Historic Places in Oregon
National Register of Historic Places in Portland, Oregon
Portland Historic Landmarks
Sellwood-Moreland, Portland, Oregon